The Bishop of Chichester is the ordinary of the Church of England Diocese of Chichester in the Province of Canterbury. The diocese covers the counties of East and West Sussex.  The see is based in the City of Chichester where the bishop's seat is located at the Cathedral Church of the Holy Trinity. On 3 May 2012 the appointment was announced of Martin Warner, Bishop of Whitby, as the next Bishop of Chichester. His enthronement took place on 25 November 2012 in Chichester Cathedral.

The bishop's residence is The Palace, Chichester. Since 2015, Warner has also fulfilled the diocesan-wide role of alternative episcopal oversight, following the decision by Mark Sowerby, then Bishop of Horsham, to recognise the orders of priests and bishops who are women.

Between 1984 and 2013, the Bishop of Chichester, in addition to being the diocesan bishop, also had specific oversight of the Chichester Episcopal Area (the then Archdeaconry of Chichester), which covered the coastal region of West Sussex along with Brighton and Hove.

Earliest history at Selsey
The episcopal see at Selsey was founded by Saint Wilfrid, formerly Bishop of the Northumbrians, for the Anglo-Saxon Kingdom of Sussex in the late 7th century. He was granted land by Æthelwealh of Sussex to build a cathedral at Selsey. However, shortly afterwards Cædwalla of Wessex conquered the Kingdom of Sussex, but he confirmed the grant to Wilfrid. The bishop's seat was located at Selsey Abbey. Nine years after the Norman conquest, in 1075, the Council of London enacted that episcopal sees should be removed to cities or larger towns. Accordingly, the see at Selsey was removed to Chichester. Some sources claim that Stigand, the last Bishop of Selsey, continued to use the title Bishop of Selsey until 1082, before adopting the new title Bishop of Chichester, indicating that the transfer took several years to complete.

List of bishops

Assistant bishops
Among those who were called Assistant Bishop of Chichester, or coadjutor bishop, were:
19301937 (d.): Henry Southwell, Canon Precentor of Chichester Cathedral and Provost of Lancing College, former Bishop of Lewes
19391953 (ret.): Charles Saunders, Rector of Uckfield (until 1942), of Barcombe (1942–47) and Vicar of West Lavington (from 1947); former Bishop in Lucknow
1965–1980 (d.): Ambrose Reeves, Rector of Lewes (until 1972) and former Anglican Bishop of Johannesburg
1966: Nathaniel Newnham Davis, former Bishop of Antigua
19941997 (res.): David Evans, Gen. Sec. of SAMS and former Bishop in Peru

See also

 Archdeacon of Chichester
 Archdeacon of Hastings
 Archdeacon of Brighton and Lewes

References

Sources
 
 Kelly, S. E. 1998. Charters of Selsey. Anglo-Saxon Charters 6.

Bishops of Chichester
History of West Sussex
 
Religion in Sussex
Catholic titular sees in Europe